The Werkkalk Formation is a geologic formation in Germany. It preserves radiolarian fossils dating back to the Oxfordian Stage of the Late Jurassic Period. The fossils may be pyritised.

See also

 List of fossiliferous stratigraphic units in Germany

References

Jurassic Germany